Eusebio Ramón Tejera Kirkerup  (6 January 1922 in Montevideo – 9 November 2002) was a Uruguayan footballer.

From 1945 to 1950 he played for Club Nacional de Football, winning the Uruguayan championship in 1946, 47 and 50. He also earned 31 caps for the Uruguay national football team from 1945 to 1954. He was part of Uruguay's championship team at the 1950 FIFA World Cup, known for the final match dubbed the Maracanazo, and also participated in the 1954 FIFA World Cup.

External links

Profile (in Spanish) 

1922 births
2002 deaths
Uruguayan footballers
Uruguay international footballers
1950 FIFA World Cup players
1954 FIFA World Cup players
FIFA World Cup-winning players
Uruguayan Primera División players
Categoría Primera A players
Club Atlético River Plate (Montevideo) players
C.A. Bella Vista players
Club Nacional de Football players
Cúcuta Deportivo footballers
Defensor Sporting players
Uruguayan expatriate footballers
Expatriate footballers in Colombia
Association football defenders